"Because You Live" is a song recorded by Jesse McCartney written by Chris Braide, Andreas Carlsson and Desmond Child.
It was released as the third single from his debut album, Beautiful Soul, in 2005 in North America and Europe while "Get Your Shine On" was released as the third single in Australia.
It is featured in the film The Princess Diaries 2: Royal Engagement.
It was sent to US radio but didn't have an official add date.
The song peaked at number one in Italy.

Cover versions
It was remixed by Sergio Dall'Ora and Luca Degani with new vocals performed by Cristian De Leo under the alias "Miky MC".  This remixed version of the original song was released on Super Eurobeat Volume 182 available in Japanese markets in CD form or as digital download through Avex Trax's mu-mo download service.

Music video
There are two versions of "Because You Live". The first version is the promo video that features Jesse McCartney in a room singing.
The second video for "Because You Live" was shot in The State Theatre Sydney, Australia, which features him performing the song, traveling somewhere, walking in Hyde Park, Sydney Australia and backstage with his fans.

Formats and track listings
'''Italian CD (1st track replaced by the "Beautiful Soul" radio edit)
. Because You Live (Radio Edit) - 3:18
. Get Your Shine On (Single Version) - 3:12
. Beautiful Soul (Drew Ferrente Mix) - 3:34

Charts

Weekly charts

Year-end charts

References

Jesse McCartney songs
Songs written by Desmond Child
2004 songs
2005 singles
Songs written by Andreas Carlsson
Songs written by Chris Braide
Hollywood Records singles
Walt Disney Records singles